Francisco Cabello Luque (born 20 May 1969, in La Zubia) is a Spanish former professional road cyclist who competed from 1990 to 2006.

Major results

1992
 1st Memorial Manuel Galera
1993
 6th Overall Vuelta a Andalucía
1994
 1st Overall Vuelta a Mallorca
 1st Stage 4 Tour de France
 3rd Overall Vuelta a Andalucía
1996
 1st Overall Vuelta a Mallorca
1st Trofeo Soller
 1st Stage 2 Vuelta a La Rioja
1998
 5th Overall Vuelta a Andalucía
1999
 1st Trofeo Calvià
 5th Overall Vuelta a La Rioja
2000
 1st Overall Vuelta a Mallorca
1st Trofeo Andratx
 2nd Overall Vuelta a Andalucía
1st Mountains classification
 7th Overall Vuelta a Murcia
1st Stage 2
2001
 2nd Circuito de Getxo
 5th Overall Vuelta a Murcia
1st Mountains classification
1st Stage 4
2002
 1st Overall Vuelta a Mallorca
 4th Overall Vuelta a Andalucía
 7th Trofeo Calvià
2003
 7th Overall Vuelta a Andalucía
 8th Klasika Primavera
 9th Trofeo Calvià
2005
 1st Overall Vuelta a Andalucía
 7th Clásica a los Puertos de Guadarrama
2006
 1st Mountains classification Clásica Internacional de Alcobendas
 9th Overall Escalada a Montjuïc

External links 

Spanish male cyclists
1969 births
Living people
Spanish Tour de France stage winners
Sportspeople from the Province of Granada
Cyclists from Andalusia